Sixto Santa Cruz (born 6 November 1986) is a professional football striker from Paraguay. He currently plays for José Gálvez.

Personal life 
He is the cousin of Manchester City striker Roque Santa Cruz.

External links
 

1986 births
Living people
Paraguayan footballers
Paraguayan expatriate footballers
Association football forwards
2 de Mayo footballers
Sport Huancayo footballers
Expatriate footballers in Peru
Expatriate footballers in Greece